Hesar Mehtar (also Romanized as Ḩeşār Mehtar) is a village in Manjilabad Rural District, in the Central District of Robat Karim County, Tehran Province, Iran. At the 2006 census, its population was 865, in 240 families.

References 

Populated places in Robat Karim County